The 2011–12 Lehigh Mountain Hawks men's basketball team represented Lehigh University during the 2011–12 NCAA Division I men's basketball season. The Mountain Hawks, led by fifth-year head coach Brett Reed, played their home games at Stabler Arena and were members of the Patriot League. They finished the season 27–8, 11–3 in Patriot League play to finish in second place in the conference.

Following the regular season, Lehigh won the Patriot League Basketball tournament to earn the conference's automatic bid into the 2012 NCAA tournament. This was their fifth NCAA Tournament appearance with their last coming in 2010. As a 15 seed, they defeated 2 seed Duke in the second round, only the sixth time in NCAA Tournament history that a 15 seed defeated a 2 seed, though it was the second time of the 2012 tournament as 15 seed Norfolk State defeated 2 seed Missouri earlier the same day. This is the last time as of 2023 that a Patriot League team has won an NCAA tournament game. They fell to Xavier in the next round.

Roster
Source

Schedule

|-
!colspan=9 style=|Regular season

|-
!colspan=9 style=| Patriot League tournament

|-
!colspan=9 style=| NCAA tournament

References

Lehigh Mountain Hawks men's basketball seasons
Lehigh
Lehigh